The 2021 UK Independence Party leadership election took place following the suspension on 12 September 2020 of leader Freddy Vachha from the UK Independence Party, with Neil Hamilton being elected to lead the party.

Background
On 12 September 2020, Freddy Vaccha was suspended from the party and therefore the leadership after complaints of bullying and harassment, with Senedd member and former MP Neil Hamilton appointed as leader.

Candidates

Result

References

2021 elections in the United Kingdom
2021
2021 in British politics
UK Independence Party leadership election